Valentina Zimina (1 January 1899 – 3 December 1928) was a silent screen actress.

Biography
Russian-born, the daughter of a Moscow stage actress, Zimina served with the Women's Battalion of Death for three years. She was in a Siberian prison, from which she escaped and made her way across Asia and onto Hollywood. The rest of her family were killed in the Russian Civil War. She made her credited screen debut opposite Bessie Love and Warner Baxter in Victor Fleming's A Son of His Father, followed by five more 1920s romantic melodramas. Zimina died of influenza just before her last film was released.

Filmography
 Gerald Cranston's Lady (1924) (uncredited)
 A Son of His Father (1925)
 La Bohème (1926)
 Rose of the Tenements (1926)
 Many Scrappy Returns (1927)
 The Woman on Trial (1927)
 The Scarlet Lady (1928)

External links

1890s births
1953 deaths
American silent film actresses
American film actresses
Burials at Hollywood Forever Cemetery
Actresses from the Russian Empire
White Russian emigrants to the United States
Russian women of World War I
20th-century American actresses
20th-century Russian women